Typhonium praetermissum is a species of plant in the arum family that is endemic to Australia.

Description
The species is a geophytic, perennial herb, which resprouts annually from a corm. The leaves vary from oval in shape to deeply divided, up to 4.5 cm long, on a stalk up to 5.5 cm long. The flower is enclosed in a brown and maroon spathe 4 cm long. The small fruits appear in November and December.

Distribution and habitat
The species occurs in the tropical Top End of the Northern Territory, with a range limited to the vicinity of Darwin and the Lichfield shire, mainly in open woodland habitats with red-brown clay or lateritic soils.

References

 
praetermissum
Monocots of Australia
Flora of the Northern Territory
Taxa named by Alistair Hay
Plants described in 1997